Foreign relations between the Argentine Republic and the Oriental Republic of Uruguay have existed for over a century. Both countries were part of the Spanish Empire until the early 19th century.

History 
Initially, both modern states of Argentina and Uruguay were part of the Spanish empire's Viceroyalty of the Río de la Plata. Buenos Aires was by then the capital city, and the Banda Oriental a province of it. During this period, both Buenos Aires and Montevideo faced two British invasions of the Río de la Plata. In the first one, the British successfully invaded Buenos Aires, being defeated later by a Montevidean army led by Santiago de Liniers. The British invaded Montevideo the second time, but failed to invade Buenos Aires, and Buenos Aires demanded the liberation of Montevideo in the British capitulation.

The Spanish king Ferdinand VII was captured during the Peninsular War, and replaced by the French Joseph Bonaparte. He was not recognized as a legitimate king, which left the Spanish monarchy without a ruler. This generated political reactions all across the Spanish Empire. Despite being of French ancestry, Liniers rejected Joseph's rule and confirmed his allegiance to the captive king, but Javier de Elío did not trust him, and created a government Junta in Montevideo. Martín de Álzaga, Elío's ally in Buenos Aires, attempted to do the same by organizing a mutiny, but failed. Elío gave up his junta when Liniers was replaced by a new viceroy, Baltasar Hidalgo de Cisneros. However, as the Spanish situation in the Peninsular War worsened, Buenos Aires deposed Cisneros during the May Revolution and create their own junta. This started the Argentine War of Independence. Montevideo was declared then the new capital of the viceroyalty, and became a Royalist stronghold. The other populations of the Banda Oriental, however, did not join Montevideo. Led by José Gervasio Artigas, they made the cry of Asencio and laid siege to the city until its defeat.

Uruguay gained its independence after the Cisplatine War, with the help of Great Britain. During the Uruguayan Civil War, Argentina supported the National Party. Both countries were allied during the War of the Triple Alliance.

Since the end of the 19th century, both countries have shared a similar European heritage. They likewise share very close economic, cultural and political ties with each other. Moreover, since around 1960, there has been significant Uruguayan emigration to Argentina, and today, there are around 120,000 people born in Uruguay living in Argentina.

Political ties
The two major political parties of Uruguay before 2002 the Colorado Party and the National Party, both called traditional parties have its origins at extinct Argentine Parties, Unitarians and Federals who in turn were descendants of bands of José Artigas. During the first century of Uruguayan Independence mayor events on both sides were chained to the international two party alliance/rivalry constituted in separate nationalized structures. Argentine Civil War started after Uruguayan Civil War in 1838, when Uruguayan ex-president Fructuoso Rivera deposed former Uruguayan president Manuel Oribe who exiled in Buenos Aires.

Boundary dispute
Limits between Argentina and Uruguay were first established in the 1827 Peace Convention.

In the period between the Peace Convention and the 1973 Boundary Treaty, which set most of the contemporary limits between both countries; the Uruguayan-Argentine boundary was established somewhere along the River Uruguay.

According to Zeballos's Doctrine, designated by the Argentine Chancellor Estanislao Severo Zeballos between 1854 and 1923, Uruguay should have no jurisdiction over the River Plate, which should only pertain to Argentina.

During José Figueroa Alcorta's Argentine presidency, three major incidents occurred:

Industrial Argentine fishing on the Uruguayan border.
Shipwreck of Argentine navy Constitución near Colonia Department.
War exercises by the Argentine Army near the Uruguayan coast.

In a treaty set on June 18 of 1988, the sole dry limit between Argentina and Uruguay is established at Martín García Island.

Diplomatic scandals
During the presidency of Jorge Batlle in Uruguay, an infidelity of a journalist carried a considerable diplomatic incident in 2002 when an off-topic commentary was aired in Uruguayan television describing Batlle saying that '''Argentines are all thieves. The incident solved after one week when Batlle publicly apologized on Argentine television.

Another filtered commentary of Uruguayan president José Mujica was aired during a meeting where he said that 'with the Turk we were better but with this old lady there is no deal''' making references to Argentine rulers Carlos Menem and Cristina Kirchner.

During a speech, Cristina Kirchner stated that 'José Gervasio Artigas wanted to be Argentine and we did not let him, this statement echoed in Uruguay for a while.

Strained relations during the Kirchner era 
Following the announced construction of a pulp mill on the Uruguayan side of the Uruguay River by Spanish manufacturer ENCE in 2003, both countries experienced their first significant diplomatic tensions since 1952, when President Juan Perón attempted to curb Argentine offshore banking in the neighboring nation. Bridges over the River Uruguay were closed for over a year. Though plans for the ENCE mill were canceled in 2005, a second mill was announced by Finland's Botnia in 2005, and the facility was opened in 2007. The Pulp mill dispute between Argentina and Uruguay remains a subject of controversy, particularly after ongoing reports of growing water contamination in the area that was later identified to be sewage discharge from the actual town of Gualeguaychú.

Today 

Argentina has an embassy in Montevideo, 4 consulates (in Colonia del Sacramento, Fray Bentos, Paysandú and Salto). Uruguay has an embassy in Buenos Aires and 2 general consulates (in Córdoba and Rosario), 3 consulates (in Colón, Concordia and Gualeguaychú), 2 honorary consulates (in Mendoza and Neuquén).

Both countries were founding members of the Mercosur. Both countries are full members of the Group of 77, of the Rio Group, of the Latin American Integration Association, of the Association of Spanish Language Academies, of the Organization of American States, of the Organization of Ibero-American States, of the Union of South American Nations, and of the Cairns Group.

In 2009, Uruguay maintained its policy of refusing landing rights for British military planes on their flights to the Falkland Islands, and in 2010 refused  entry to the Port of Montevideo.

One of the most important commercial relations between Uruguay and Argentina is related to tourism. For Uruguay, Argentine tourism is key, since it represents 56% of the external tourism they receive each year and 70% during the summer months. In 2017, Argentina and Uruguay signed a Memorandum of Understanding for the implementation of the ‘Strengthening Connectivity’ (Fortalecimiento de la Conectividad) project. This project is focused on improving communications between the countries. It aims to develop greater connectivity by creating fiber optic links to interconnection points where international internet providers are located, and to submarine cables that reach the Argentine coast.

See also 
 Argentines in Uruguay
 Uruguayans in Argentina

References

External links 

  Argentine Ministry of Foreign Relations: list of bilateral treaties with Uruguay until 1993 (in Spanish only)
  Argentine Ministry of Foreign Relations: list of bilateral treaties with Uruguay from 1994 (in Spanish only)
  Argentina embassy in Montevideo (in Spanish only)
  Uruguayan embassy in Buenos Aires (in Spanish only)

 
Uruguay
Bilateral relations of Uruguay